Huelva is a surname of Spanish origin. Notable people with the surname are as follows:

 Amaro Huelva (born 1973), Spanish politician 
 Elena Huelva (2002–2023), Spanish influencer and writer

Surnames of Spanish origin